The 1963–64 Liga Bet season saw Hapoel Safed,  Hapoel Netanya, Beitar Lod and Hapoel Ashkelon win their regional divisions and promoted to Liga Alef.

Second placed clubs, Beitar Haifa, Hapoel Ra'anana, Beitar Harari Tel Aviv and Maccabi Holon were also promoted, as Liga Alef expanded to 16 clubs in each division. also, as there was an odd number of clubs for next season Liga Alef (15 teams competed in Liga Leumit), another promotion spot given to the best third placed club (rather than promotion playoffs), which was Hapoel Bnei Nazareth.

North Division A

North Division B

South Division A

South Division B

References
Promoted and relegated teams determined Maariv, 24.5.64, Historical Jewish Press 

Liga Bet seasons
Israel
3